Associated Architects is a leading AJ100 architectural firm with offices in Birmingham and Leeds, England. Founded in 1968, the practice has a broad portfolio of work including arts, commercial offices, residential, masterplanning and leisure and is particularly known for its work in education. It has received many national awards including over 30 RIBA Awards, together with the RIBA Sustainability Award. For its commercial work it has been awarded 9 BCO Awards, British Council for Offices. The practice designed the George Davies Centre, at the University of Leicester, currently the largest (non-domestic) building in the UK to be Passivhaus accredited. It is also responsible for the design and delivery of Bartholomew Barn, the UK's first "multi-comfort" building, a benchmark pioneered by Saint Gobain. The building has set a new bar for sustainable architecture.

History 
The practice was formed by Malcolm Booth, Richard Slawson and Walter Thomson, who met as teachers at the Birmingham School of Architecture in the 1960s. At that time the School undertook live projects and the founders were encouraged to set up a part-time practice, employing students to undertake the work with appropriate management. The work was soon supplemented with private commissions and the move of the School from Aston University prompted the partners to commit to full-time practice in 1973.

The practice name was conceived as having a life beyond the founders, its name Associated Architects chosen deliberately not to include their surnames. The early workload of housing, industrial buildings and offices expanded and the practice relocated in 1976 to St. Paul's Square, which it used as a base for the regeneration of the Jewellery Quarter. It developed skills in urban regeneration, with listed buildings and in urban housing, anticipating the city living movement by a decade.

Paul Lister joined the practice in 1976, becoming a partner in 1984: Ian Standing joined in 1985 and became a partner in 1989. At this time the practice undertook its first projects with independent schools, developing this into a broad education workload. It won its first RIBA Awards and with the Property Services Agency undertook commissions for Law Courts at Stafford and Worcester, opening a Cyprus office to deliver projects for the Ministry of Defence. University work developed at this time with projects including the Birmingham School of Jewellery and the restoration of the Grade I listed Birmingham School of Art.

As the National Lottery made funds available for Arts projects in the 1990s, the practice won national competitions for projects including the City of Birmingham Symphony Orchestra Centre (with Sir Simon Rattle), the Water Hall Gallery and the rebuilding of the Birmingham Hippodrome. Following its work on the first mixed use building at 9 Brindleyplace it built numerous offices and subsequently delivered the largest mixed use building in the UK: the Mailbox.

Matthew Goer joined in 1990 and became a partner in 2001. The founders retired between 1996 and 2002 and Paul Lister retired in 2006. Warren Jukes and Adam Wardle joined in 1996 and with Matthew Goer and Ian Standing became directors of the Limited Liability Partnership in 2003. During 2012 James Hall was promoted to Director and Richard Perry to Director in 2014. Ian Standing retired 2016 having served over 30 years. Adam Wardle died unexpectedly in June 2013, at the age of 42. His obituary appeared in the RIBA Journal.

Associated Architects retains its close relationship with the School of Architecture and has strong links with the cultural and business communities in the city. Although based in Birmingham and deriving much of its work from the region, it also works nationally and internationally.

Architectural work

Education 
Universities
School of Architecture and the Built Environment, University of Wolverhampton, 2020
Edward Boyle Library, University of Leeds 2017.
New Library, University of Birmingham, 2016.
Centre for Medicine, University of Leicester, 2016.
The Curzon Building, Birmingham City University, 2015.
Birmingham Institute of Art & Design, Birmingham City University, 2013 (RIBA Award 2014)
David Wilson Library, University of Leicester, 2008. (RIBA Award 2009)
Health, Design & Technology Centre, Coventry University, 2009
Birmingham School of Art, Birmingham City University, 1995. (RIBA Award 1996)
School of Jewellery, Birmingham City University, 1994. (RIBA Award 1995)

Independent schools
Bartholomew Barn, Kings Hawford Junior School, Worcester, 2016
Yarm School, Stockton-on-Tees, 2012 (RIBA Award 2013)
The Michael Baker Boathouse, The King's School, Worcester, 2012 (RIBA Award 2013)
King's School Art School, The King's School, Worcester, 2007
King's School Library, The King's School, Worcester, 2006. (RIBA Award 2008)
The British School, Abu Dhabi, UAE, 2005
Mary Windsor Boarding House, Bromsgrove School, 2002
Theatre and Hall, Queen Margaret's School, York, 2002. (RIBA White Rose Award for Design Excellence 2004)
Theatre, Dean Close School, Cheltenham, 1992

Schools
Starbank School All-Through School, 2016
The University of Birmingham School, University of Birmingham, 2015
St Peter's Academy, Stoke BSF, 2013
Birmingham BSF (Building Schools for the Future), 2012
Old Swinford Hospital School, Stourbridge, 2010
St. Olave's, St. Peter's School, York, 2009
Charter Primary School & Surestart Centre, Coventry, 2005
Hagley Primary School, Hagley, 2004

Colleges
West Midlands Construction UTC, University of Wolverhampton, CITB, 2016
Health Futures UTC (University Technical College), West Midlands Ambulance Service & NHS Foundation, 2015
Campus Redevelopment, University College Birmingham, 2013
Blossomfield Campus, Solihull College, Birmingham, 2010
Progress Centre, Cannock Chase Technology College, Cannock, 2004
Worcester VI Form College, Worcester, 2002

Offices 
Platform 21, Birmingham, completion expected 2021
6 East Parade, Leeds, 2017
West Bromwich Building Society Headquarters Offices, West Bromwich, 2016 
10 Woodcock Street, Birmingham City Council, 2012 (National BCO Award 2013)
Operations Centre, Severn Trent Water, Coventry, 2010
One Severn Street Place, Associated Architects, Birmingham, 2009
Project Sunrise, Punch Taverns, Burton, 2009
134 Edmund Street, Birmingham, 2004
Interchange Place, Birmingham, 2003

Mixed-use 
10 Brindleyplace, Birmingham, completion expected 2022
Post & Mail, Birmingham
The Mailbox, Birmingham, 2000
9 Brindleyplace, Birmingham, 1999

Culture 
Lapworth Museum of Geology, University of Birmingham, 2015
Birmingham Town Hall, 2007
Birmingham Hippodrome, 2001 (in conjunction with Law Dunbar Nasmith). (RIBA Award 2002)
The Water Hall, Birmingham, 2001
The CBSO Centre, 1998 and refurbished by Associated Architects in 2014

Residential 
Tyndal Street, Cardiff, Completion expected 2022
Newhall Square (PRS Development), Spitfire Homes, 2020
Old Union Mill, Birmingham
1 Swallow Street, Birmingham, 2016
Eco Vicarages, Diocese of Worcester, 2012
Cobtun House, Worcester, 2003. (RIBA Award 2005, RIBA Sustainability Award 2005)
St Crispin's Manor, Northampton, 2008
Crown Lofts, Walsall, 2003
Washington Wharf, Birmingham, 2001

Other 
Jaguar Land Rover Manufacturing Building, i54 Business Park, 2017
Southwater One, Telford, 2014 (Triple RIBA Award Winner 2014)
Birmingham Dogs' Home Rescue and Welfare Centre, 2015
Bristol Civil Justice Centre, Bristol, 2010
Acorn's Children's Hospice, Worcester, 2005
Wapping Wharf Masterplan, Bristol
Stafford Combined Court, Stafford, 1991
Lee Bank Health Centre, Birmingham, 1990. (RIBA Award 1990)

Awards 
2016 RIBA West Midlands Award, McIntyre House, University College Birmingham
2015 RIBA West Midlands Award, Southwater One, Telford & Wrekin Council
2014 RIBA East Midlands Building of the Year Award, College Court, University of Leicester
2014 RIBA East Midlands Award, College Court, University of Leicester
2014 RIBA East Midlands Conservation Award, College Court, University of Leicester
2014 RIBA West Midlands Award, The Parkside Building, Birmingham City University
2014 RIBA West Midlands Award, The Lighthouse, Birmingham Youth Services
2013 RIBA North East Award: Princess Alexandra Auditorium, Yarm independent school
2013 RIBA West Midlands Award: The Michael Baker Boathouse, The King's School Worcester
2009 RIBA Award: David Wilson Library, University of Leicester
2008 RIBA East Midlands Award: David Wilson Library, University of Leicester
2008 RIBA Award: The King's School Library, Worcester
2005 RIBA Sustainability Award: Cobtun House, Worcester
2005 RIBA Award: Cobtun House, Worcester
2004 RIBA White Rose Award for Design Excellence: Queen Margaret's School, York
2002 RIBA Award: Hippodrome Theatre, Birmingham
1998 RIBA Housing Design Award: City Heights, Birmingham
1997 RIBA Housing Design Award: Berkley Court, Birmingham
1996 RIBA Award: College of Art, Birmingham
1995 RIBA Award: School of Jewellery, Birmingham
1993 RIBA Award: 30 St. Paul's Square, Birmingham
1993 RIBA Housing Design Award: Malt Mill Lane, Alcester
1992 RIBA Award: Clayton Hall, Lilleshall NSC
1990 RIBA Award: The Walled Garden, Brockhampton
1989 RIBA Award: Lee Bank Health Centre, Birmingham
1986 RIBA Award: Malt Mill Lane, Alcester
1983 RIBA Housing Design Award: Steven's Terrace, Birmingham
1983 RIBA Award: Brown's Restaurant, Worcester
1982 RIBA Award: Pleck Orchard, Hartlebury
1979 RIBA Housing Design Award: Bishop's Court, Northfield, Birmingham

Publications 
XL, Associated Architects Publishing, 2008
Buildings that Feel Good, Ziona Strelitz, RIBA Publishing, 2008
Birmingham: Shaping the City, Ben Flatman, RIBA Publishing, 2008
Birmingham (Pevsner Architectural Guide), Andy Foster, Yale University Press, 2005

External links
Associated Architects Official Website
CABE Case Study: The Mailbox
CABE Case Study: Birmingham Hippodrome

Architecture firms based in Birmingham, West Midlands
Companies based in Birmingham, West Midlands
Design companies established in 1968
1968 establishments in England